Dimitri from Paris (born Dimitrios Yerasimos, ; 27 October 1963) is a French music producer and DJ of Greek descent. His musical influences are rooted in 1970s funk and disco sounds that spawned contemporary house music, as well as original soundtracks from 1950s and 1960s movies such as Breakfast at Tiffany's, La Dolce Vita and The Party, which were sampled in his album Sacrebleu. Dimitri fused these sounds with electro and block party hip hop he discovered in the 1980s.

Life and career
Contrary to his musical pseudonym, Dimitri was born not in Paris but born in Peckham, South London, to Rûm parents (Greeks of Turkey), Dimitri grew up in France where he discovered DJing at home, using whatever he could find to "cut and paste" samples from disco hits or in to montages heard on the radio, blending them together to make tapes. This early experimentation helped him launch his DJ career.

Early career
He started out by DJing at the French station Radio 7, before moving on to Skyrock and finally to Radio NRJ, Europe's largest FM radio network, in 1986. There, he introduced the first ever house music show to be broadcast in France, while simultaneously producing under the direction of sound designer Michel Gaubert, runway soundtracks for fashion houses such as Chanel, Jean-Paul Gaultier, Hermès and Yves Saint-Laurent. He also released two solo EPs from 1993 to 1994 and contributed to the Yellow Productions compilation La Yellow 357.

Recording career
In 1996, Dimitri gained worldwide recognition with the release of his first full album, Sacrebleu, released on Yellow Productions. A blend of diverse influences including jazz, original film soundtracks, samba, and organic house, Sacrebleu sold 300,000 copies worldwide and was named Album of the Year by UK's Mixmag magazine.

In 2000, Dimitri followed Sacrebleu up with A Night at the Playboy Mansion (Virgin) and Disco Forever (BBE), followed by My Salsoul in 2001, After the Playboy Mansion in 2002. In 2003, Cruising Attitude was released, to be closely followed by his first outing on UK's premier dance music label Defected: Dimitri from Paris In the House.

He has followed a somewhat glamorous musical path by recording soundtracks and advertising campaigns for fashion houses Chanel, Jean-Paul Gautier and Yves Saint Laurent and remixing hundreds of artists as diverse as Björk, The Cardigans, James Brown, Michael Jackson, New Order and Quincy Jones. He also did the music for the anime Tsukuyomi: Moon Phase and mixed the soundtrack for the French luxury dessin animé Jet Groove produced by Method Films.

Recent developments
2005 saw Dimitri go back to his Funk and Disco roots, with Japanese hip hop producer and über collector DJ Muro for Super Disco Friends a double CD mixdown. In 2006 he offered his House of Love outing to Valentine's Day's lovers. Later on Dimitri produced Los Amigos Invisibles "Super Pop Venezuela" album which grabbed a nomination for a Grammy Award.

2007 saw the release of the Cocktail Disco project with label BBE. Dimitri described in the notes to the project that he arrived to the material through a "kind of evolution in music collecting [where] the more you complete one genre, the more you move to a sub genre, a sub, sub genre, eventually branching out to different musical paths, to avoid being stuck in dead ends. It turns out records I would overlook a few years back, are the ones I feverishly hunt now. One of many such sub genres I grew up to love over the years, is a type of Disco that I could best describe as Cocktail Disco."

Dimitri described the Cocktail Disco sub-genre as having "that ubiquitous 4/4 beat and flying open high hat, complemented by rich orchestrations, campy over the top vocals, and an often tropical latin vibe. Something that wouldn’t feel out of place in a Broadway musical." He also pointed out that he believes "the same style was called Sleaze back in its days, from roughly 1976 to 1979. There were even DJs specialized in the Sleaze sound which was usually played after hours, in spots with a strong sex-oriented drive."

The Cocktail Disco compilation includes tracks from Astrud Gilberto, Blue Velvets, the Ritchie Family and Paul Mauriat ("The Joy of You," from his New York-recorded disco album collaboration with Gérard Gambus Overseas Call).

2009 saw the release of the Night Dubbin''', a post-disco R&B compilation remix album.

Discography
Studio albums
 Sacrebleu, 1996
 Cruising Attitude, 2003

Compilation albums
 Monsieur Dimitri's De-Luxe House of Funk, 1997
 A Night at the Playboy Mansion, 2000
 Disco Forever, 2000
 My Salsoul, 2001
 After the Playboy Mansion, 2002
 In the House, 2004
 Neko Mimi Mode, 2004
 The Kings of Disco, 2004 compiled by Dimitri from Paris and Joey Negro
 TV Tokyo Animation Tsukuyomi–Moon Phase– Best Collection "Zenbu, Kikitakunacchatta…", 2005
 Super Disco Friends, 2005 compiled by Dimitri from Paris and DJ Muro
 Southport Weekender, 2005 compiled by Dimitri from Paris, Jazzie B, and Quentin Harris
 In the House of Love, 2006
 Cocktail Disco, 2007
 Return to the Playboy Mansion, 2008
 Night Dubbin', 2009 compiled by Dimitri from Paris & The Idjut Boys
 Get Down With The Philly Sound, 2010
 Knights of the Playboy Mansion, 2011
 The Remix Files, 2011
 Back In The House, 2012
 In the House of Disco, 2014
 Dimitri From Paris Presents Le CHIC Remix, 2018

Remixes
Stardust - Music Sounds Better With You
Mark Ronson - Nothing Breaks Like a Heart
Jackson 5 - I Want You Back
Daft Punk - Get Lucky

References

External links

Dimitri from Paris at Resident Advisor
Dimitri from Paris – clubnight of note at Queen''
Dimitri from Paris interview on personal style

Greek DJs
1963 births
Living people
Turkish people of Greek descent
French people of Greek descent
Musicians from Istanbul
Electronic dance music DJs